Umar Semata (born 20 May 1987) is a Ugandan middleweight and super middleweight Muay Thai fighter and the former World Boxing Council Muay Thai Interim Super Middleweight Champion, a title he has held since 14 June 2013.

Biography

Early career
After winning numerous events in boxing, he was spotted by Shala Golola who immediately recognized his talents and convinced him to swap to Muay Thai. Semata was selected at the age of 18 to represent the Ugandan national Muay Thai team to compete in Thailand.

Muay Thai
In an event organized by the World Professional Muaythai Federation Semata lost by point to Saenchai on 20 July 2012 in Ratchaburi Province, Thailand.

East African Muay Thai International Champion  
On 14 June 2013, Semata faced Australian fighter Rhys Karakyriacos and won on points the World Boxing Council Muay Thai Interim Super Middleweight Champion. The fight took place in Semata's hometown of Kampala, Uganda.

Lethwei
In 2017, Semata agreed to terms with the World Lethwei Championship and on 4 November, Semata made his Lethwei debut against veteran Soe Lin Oo at WLC 3: Legendary Champions in Yangon, Myanmar inside the Thuwunna National Indoor Stadium. Semata lost by knockout in the second round.

Lethwei record 

|-  style="background:#fbb;"
| 2017-04-11 || Loss ||align=left| Soe Lin Oo || WLC 3: Legendary Champions || Yangon, Myanmar || KO (Right Cross) || 2 ||
|-
| colspan=9 | Legend:

Muay Thai record

|-  style="background:#fbb;"
| 2016-06-05 || Loss ||align=left| Kem Sitsongpeenong || Emei Legend 9 || China || Decision || 3 || 3:00
|-  bgcolor="#CCFFCC"
| 2016-04-02 || Win||align=left| Wang Pengfei || EM Lgend 7 || Xichang, China || Decision || 3 || 3:00
|-  style="background:#cfc;"
| 2014-12-10 || Win ||align=left| Khankhan Wongtrakol || Kunlun Fight 6 World title Super Welterweight|| Hong Kong, China || Decision || 3 || 3:00 
|-
|-  style="background:#cfc;"
| 2014-05-03 || Win ||align=left| Abdallah Hussein || WKF AFRICA Champion in Super Welterweight|| Kampala, Uganda || Decision || 5 || 3:00 
|-
|-  style="background:#fbb;"
| 2014-02-19 || Loss ||align=left| Imwiset Pornarai || Yokkao 7 || Pattaya, Thailand || Decision || 3 || 3:00
|-  style="background:#fbb;"
| 2014-01-25 || Loss ||align=left| Andrei Kulebin || Kunlun Fight 1. Semi Finals || Pattaya, Thailand || Decision || 3 || 3:00 
|-
|-  style="background:#cfc;"
| 2013-06-14 ||Win ||align=left| Rhys Karakyriacos || WBC Muay thai International Super Middleweight Champion  ||  Kampala, Uganda || Decision  || 5 || 3:00
|-
|-  style="background:#fbb;"
| 2012-11-29 ||Loss ||align=left| Superbon Lookjaomaesaivaree || Muay Thai Warriors||  Thailand || Decision  || 5 || 3:00
|-  style="background:#fbb;"
| 2012-07-20 ||Loss ||align=left| Saenchai PKSaenchaimuaythaigym || WPMF Super Welterweight title Muaythai Gala – TV 11 || Ratchaburi Province, Thailand || Decision  || 5 || 3:00
|-
|-  style="background:#fbb;"
| 2011-11-02 ||Loss ||align=left| Jomhod Kiatadisak || Bangla Stadium || Phuket, Thailand, Thailand || Decision  || 5 || 3:00
|-
| colspan=9 | Legend:

References

1987 births
Living people
Middleweight kickboxers
Ugandan male kickboxers
Ugandan Muay Thai practitioners
Ugandan Lethwei practitioners
Welterweight kickboxers
Kunlun Fight kickboxers